Los Incas - Parque Chas is a station on Line B of the Buenos Aires Underground. The station was opened on 9 August 2003 as the western terminus of the extension of the line from Federico Lacroze. It remained the terminus of the line until the opening of Juan Manuel de Rosas station on 26 July 2013.

It is located between the Villa Ortuzar and Parque Chas barrios, at the intersection of Avenida Triunvirato and Avenida de Los Incas.

Gallery

References

External links

Buenos Aires Underground stations
Railway stations opened in 2003
2003 establishments in Argentina